Wilberforce may refer to:

People
Wilberforce (name), for people (and fictional characters) with the name
William Wilberforce (1759–1833), British politician, evangelical reformer and campaigner against the slave trade

Places

Australia
 Wilberforce, New South Wales
 Wilberforce Cemetery
 Wilberforce Park

Canada
 Wilberforce, Ontario
 Wilberforce Colony, Ontario; an 18th-century colony of American Black citizens
 Kattimannap Qurlua (formerly Wilberforce Falls), in Wilberforce Gorge, Nunavut
 North Algona Wilberforce, a township in Renfrew County, Ontario; formed from North Algona and Wilberforce Townships

United Kingdom
 Wilberforce House, the birthplace of William Wilberforce, in Hull, England
 Wilberforce Way, a walking route between Hull and York, England
 Wilberfoss, East Riding of Yorkshire, England
 Wilberforce Oak, a tree stump near Holwood House, Keston, England

Other
 Wilberforce, Ohio, United States
 Wilberforce, Sierra Leone
 Wilberforce River, in the Southern Alps of New Zealand

Education
 Wilberforce College, in Hull, England
 Wilberforce Institute, research institute at the University of Hull, England
 Wilberforce School, in Princeton Junction, New Jersey
 Wilberforce University, in Wilberforce, Ohio
 Central State University, a public, historically black university in Wilberforce, Ohio (formerly Wilberforce State University)

Other uses
 Wilberforce (cat), who lived at 10 Downing Street between 1973 and 1987
 Wilberforce pendulum

See also
 Wilbur Force, a character in The Little Shop of Horrors
 Paterson Wilberforce, a U.S. soccer team which played in the National Association Football League in the early 20th century
 Wilberforce Award, given by Ratanak International to people who fight human trafficking
 The Wilberforce Society, an independent, non-partisan, student think tank at Cambridge University
 William Wilberforce Trafficking Victims Protection Reauthorization Act of 2008, a federal statute by the U.S. Congress